The Rochester Flash was an American soccer club based in Rochester, New York that was a member of the American Soccer League.

History
In 1981, the Rochester Flash entered the American Soccer League, playing its home games at Holleder Memorial Stadium.  In 1983, the team went on hiatus, but returned in 1984 as a member of the newly formed United Soccer League.

Yearly Awards
 First Team All Star
1981: John Dolinsky, Dennis Mepham
 Rookie of the Year
1982:  Franco Paonessa

Year-by-year

Coaches
 Don Lalka (1981–1982)
 Joe Horvath (1984)

Staff
 Joe Sirianni, Trainer/Traveling Secretary

References

External links

United Soccer League (1984–85) teams
Men's soccer clubs in New York (state)
Defunct soccer clubs in New York (state)
American Soccer League (1933–1983) teams
Flash
1981 establishments in New York (state)
Association football clubs established in 1981
1984 disestablishments in New York (state)
Association football clubs disestablished in 1984